Risoba lunata is a species of moth of the family Nolidae. It is found in Ghana, Congo and Nigeria .

A known foodplant of its larvae is Combretum

References
Möschler, 1887. Beiträge zur Schmetterlings-Fauna der Goldküste. - Abhandlungen der Senckenbergische Naturforschende Gesellschaft 15(1):49–100, pl. 1.

External links

Nolidae
Moths described in 1887